Vysoký kámen, is the name of at least nine hills in Slovakia and the Czech Republic, they are distinguished by their height. This article is on the 773 m summit, in Vogtland

The stony summit Vysoký kámen (German Hoher Stein) lies  8 km west of Kraslice in okres Sokolov (Czech Republic) and 1 km from the German border in the Elstergebirge, part of the Erzgebirge.

To the east of the hill is Počátky originally Kámen u Kraslic (German: Stein am Hohen Stein) and Kostelní (German: Kirchberg am Hohen Stein), and to the west lies Erlbach with it hamlet Eubabrunn.

The ridge of rocks at the summit resemble a ruined castle. It is the western rocks that are used by climbers. They are ideal for beginners, with some low difficulty routes. It is also in the west that one finds the highest point, which rises to 773m. It can  be reached by means of a bridge and steel steps- forming a popular panorama point, (German:Aussichtsfelsen) or (Czech:Vyhlidková skála).

The ridge continues in a wall like formation, terminating at the eastern end with the Felsturm Zobák (Schnabel) and the monumental Felsen Vêtrná skála (Windfelsen). Near these precipitous formations is a Felsenmeer, a sea of free standing boulders that are in parts united with clay. The rocks are Quartz on a bed of slate. Vysoký kámen is protected as a natural monument since 1907. Even so, since then it has been threatened by quarrying four times.

At the end of the second world war, countless fleeing German soldiers used Vysoký kámen as their exit route from German Sudetenland, which was reclassified as Czechoslovakia, back into Saxony. They passed through the thick forest from Eubabrunn and Erlbach over the border, avoiding the borderposts of the US Army of Occupation, and thus avoiding imprisonment.

The former restaurant Wirtshaus am Hohen Stein, a well loved daytrip destination was destroyed in 1945 but the 8 m deep well that is hidden in the woods still remains. Vysoký kámen can be reached from Eubabrunn on the Czech side,(using the parking at the Freilichtmuseum). It is about an hour's walk from there.  On the German side the path is made up and well signed.

Notes 
This article is based on its German Wikipedia equivalent.

External links 

  Natura 2000, Vysoký kámen photos, map and description 

Mountains and hills of the Czech Republic